Visual User Environment (VUE or HP VUE) is a discontinued desktop environment developed by Hewlett-Packard, intended for use on Unix workstations. VUE is based on the Motif widget toolkit and targets the X Window System.

VUE is a precursor to Common Desktop Environment (CDE), which was also based on Motif.

History 

Work began on VUE in 1988 at Apollo Computer for use with Domain/OS, as an alternative to Apollo's standard DM and wmgr.

Shortly later, HP acquired Apollo, where they released the first version of VUE for Domain/OS, and then went on to modify VUE for use with HP-UX.

 VUE 1.0 – Released with Domain/OS SR10.4
 VUE 1.1
 VUE 2.0 – Released for HP-UX
 VUE 2.0.1
 VUE 3.0 – Released with HP-UX 9.0 in 1992

According to an article published in the Hewlett-Packard Journal, the look and feel of HP-VUE was used when developing the Common Desktop Environment (CDE):

After its release, HP endorsed CDE as the new standard desktop for Unix, and provided documentation and software for migrating VUE customizations to CDE.

See also 
 Motif Window Manager
 Common Desktop Environment

References

External links 

 
 
 Introduction to HP VUE
 HP Vue and CDE: Differences Between the Interfaces (Purdue University)

HP software
Desktop environments
Software that uses Motif (software)
X window managers